Manuel Francisco Serra (6 November 1935 – 5 August 1994), commonly known as Serra, was a Portuguese footballer who played as a defender for Benfica.

Personal life
Serra was born in the São Sebastião da Pedreira parish of Lisbon on 6 November 1935. He was murdered on 5 August 1994 at the age of 58, having been shot by a cousin in Agualva-Cacém.

Honours
European Cup: 1960–61, 1961–62
Primeira Liga: 1956–57, 1959–60, 1960–61
Taça de Portugal: 1957–58, 1958–59, 1961–62

References

External links
 
 Biography
 

1935 births
1994 deaths
Portuguese footballers
Footballers from Lisbon
Primeira Liga players
S.L. Benfica footballers
Portugal international footballers
Male murder victims
Portuguese murder victims
People murdered in Portugal
Association football fullbacks
1994 murders in Portugal